The women's 1500 meter at the 2022 KNSB Dutch Single Distance Championships in Heerenveen took place at Thialf ice skating rink on Friday 28 October 2021. Although the tournament was held in 2021 it was the 2022 edition as it was part of the 2021–2022 speed skating season. There were 24 participants. The first 5 skaters were eligible for the following World Cup tournaments.

Statistics

Result

Referee: Berri de Jonge. Assistant: Suzan van  den Belt.  Starter: Marco Hesselink. 
Start: 17:14.00 hr. Finish 17:53.44 hr.

Source:

Draw

References

Single Distance Championships
2022 Single Distance
World